Dead Season (translit. Myortvyy sezon) is a 1968 Soviet spy film directed by Savva Kulish based on a screenplay by Aleksandr Shlepyanov and Vladimir Vajnshtok and featuring Donatas Banionis and Rolan Bykov.

Plot
A connection between Dr. Hass and the West German intelligence was killed at an airport in one of the European countries. Encryption was discovered in the pocket of the murdered person for the purchase of raw material for mass production of RH gas.

The possibilities of gas are such that in small doses it stimulates the intellectual potential of a person, in large ones it turns them into a joyous idiot and a laborer-robot. The case of Haas is handled by the Soviet intelligence colonel Konstantin Ladeynikov. The main difficulty is that Ladeynikov has fallen into the sight of the intelligence services, but the intelligence officer asks for permission from his leadership to stay in the country and continue work.

However, Ladeynikov has no portrait of Hass so he needs a person who can identify him. The KGB leadership appeals to the actor of the children's theater, the father of two children, Ivan  Savushkin, with a request to draw a portrait of Hass. In 1944, Savushkin fled from a Nazi concentration camp, where Hass conducted his fatal experiments, turning people into meaningless animals. Over time, Savushkin understands how much he depends on him in the operation with Haas and agrees to go to help Ladeynikov. In addition, he knows German well.

Cast
 Donatas Banionis as Ladeynikov / Lonsfield (voiced by Alexander Demyanenko)
 Rolan Bykov as Savushkin 
 Gennadi Yukhtin as Muravyov
 Bruno Freindlich as Valery Petrovich
 Svetlana Korkoshko as Ellis
 Jüri Järvet as Professor O'Reilly
 Laimonas Noreika as Nicholls
 Stepan Krylov as former prisoner of concentration camp
 Ants Eskola as Smith
 Leonhard Merzin as Father Mortimer
 Einari Koppel as Drayton
 Mauri Raus as Greban
 Vladimir Erenberg as Professor Born / Hass
 Anda Zaice as Catrine

Trivia
 Film features a scene of exchange of the spies on the Glienicke Bridge.
 Vladimir Putin once stated that Banionis' part in the film was the reason why he joined the KGB.

References

External links

1968 films
Lenfilm films
Cold War spy films
1960s adventure drama films
1960s spy drama films
Films set in Germany
Soviet spy drama films
Soviet adventure drama films
Soviet black-and-white films
Television episodes about Nazis
Biological weapons in popular culture

Films about Nazi fugitives
Films about the KGB
Films set in West Germany